Tang Zonghai (1851–1897 or 1908), courtesy name Rongchuan, was a Chinese physician and medical scholar active during the late Qing dynasty. Tang was one of the first Chinese physicians to write about the distinctions between Chinese and Western medicine, as well as an early advocate for the integration of the two traditions.

Early life
Tang was born in 1851 in Pengzhou, Sichuan. His father died from illness in 1873, prompting him to study classical medicine. Tang engaged with the writings of Chinese physicians like , whereas his frequent trips to Shanghai, a port city, also exposed him to Western medicine.

Career
Tang became a jinshi at the age of 38. Instead of joining the civil service, as many of his peers who had been successful in the imperial examinations did, he decided to pursue a career in medicine. Beginning his practice in Sichuan, one of Tang's earliest writings was published in 1884 and concerned blood disorders. After relocating to Jiangnan in the 1880s, Tang developed a keen interest in Western medicine, and became one of the first Chinese physicians to write about the distinctions between Chinese and Western medicine. He was also an early advocate for the integration of both medical traditions.

Tang's 1892 work, Zhongxi huitong yijing jingyi, has been described as "one of the most influential medical texts" of his time. In it, Tang defends Chinese medicine—which he sees as having been in decline since the Song dynasty—while exploring the complex relationship between modern Western anatomy and Chinese medicine.

Sometime after the publication of Zhongxi huitong yijing jingyi, Tang wrote Yiyi tongshuo, or A Generalised Account of Medicine and the Classic of Changes, in which he argues that the ancient Chinese text I Ching (Classic of Changes) included ideas that had hitherto been thought of as uniquely Western. Tang died in either 1897 or 1908.

Notes

References

Citations

Bibliography

 
 
 
 
 
 
 
 

1851 births
1908 deaths
19th-century Chinese writers
People from Sichuan
Chinese medical writers
Physicians from Sichuan